A slasher is a basketball player who primarily drives (slashes) to the basket when on offense. They are typically a guard, but can also be a forward. A slasher is a fast and athletic player who attempts to get close to the basket for a layup, dunk or teardrop shot. This style of high-percentage two-point play is commonly referred to as slashing.

Slashers usually take more free-throw shots than other players due to the increased amount of contact made on them as they constantly and aggressively run towards the basket. Many different kinds of slashers gain extra free-throws by "drawing fouls", which is deliberately causing contact with a defending player. They may spend many hours working on increasing their free-throw percentage.

Many players who begin as slashers typically develop their game (especially their jump shot), as age and injuries occur, which may prevent them from being as effective as a slasher (for example, Michael Jordan and Kobe Bryant both developed a fadeaway jump shot as they got older).

Examples of slashers
 Giannis Antetokounmpo
 Elgin Baylor
 RJ Barrett
 Kobe Bryant
 Jimmy Butler
 Vince Carter
 Stephen Curry
 DeMar DeRozan
 Goran Dragic
 Kevin Durant
 Monta Ellis
 Julius Erving
 Paul George
 George Gervin
 Kawhi Leonard
 Manu Ginóbili
 James Harden
 Penny Hardaway
 Grant Hill
 Kyrie Irving
 Allen Iverson
 LeBron James
 Eddie Johnson
 Magic Johnson
 Michael Jordan
 Zach LaVine
 Damian Lillard
 John Lucas
 Brandon Roy 
 Pete Maravich
 Tracy Mcgrady
 Earl Monroe
 Calvin Murphy
 Victor Oladipo
 Tony Parker
 Paul Pierce
 Scottie Pippen
 Rajon Rondo
 Derrick Rose
 Ben Simmons
 Jerry Stackhouse
 Dwyane Wade
 John Wall
 Russell Westbrook
 Dominique Wilkins
 Clyde Drexler
 Jaylen Brown
 Ja Morant
 Donovan Mitchell
 Kevin Martin

References

Basketball terminology
Basketball strategy
Basketball positions